Sir Edwin Hughes (27 May 1832 – 15 September 1904) was an English solicitor and Conservative politician who sat in the House of Commons from 1885 to 1902.

Biography
Hughes was born at Droitwich, Worcestershire, the son of William Hughes and his wife Elizabeth Gibbs. He was educated at Birmingham Grammar School and was admitted a solicitor in 1860. He moved to London where he became a solicitor to Local Board of Health. He was vice chairman of the Modern Building Society and chairman of Suburban Property Co. His political interests included being a  member of the London School Board, and of the Metropolitan Board of Works. He was founder and vice president of the Metropolitan Local Government (Officers') Association.  He was also lieutenant-colonel in the 1st Volunteer Brigade, London Division of the Royal Artillery.  In 1881 he was resident in Plumstead.

Hughes was at one time Conservative Election Agent for London and the Borough of Greenwich. In 1885 Hughes was himself elected Member of Parliament for Woolwich. He held the seat until 1902.

Hughes was also the first representative on the London County Council for Woolwich in 1889 and served three terms. He was Mayor of Woolwich in 1901, and was also on the board of governors for Woolwich Polytechnic.

He was made a Knight Bachelor in the 1902 Birthday Honours and knighted by King Edward VII at Buckingham Palace on 18 December 1902.

Hughes died aged 72 and was buried in Plumstead Cemetery.

Arms

See also

List of members of London County Council 1889 - 1919

References

External links
 

1832 births
1904 deaths
Conservative Party (UK) MPs for English constituencies
Knights Bachelor
UK MPs 1885–1886
UK MPs 1886–1892
UK MPs 1892–1895
UK MPs 1895–1900
UK MPs 1900–1906
Members of the London School Board
Members of the Metropolitan Board of Works
Mayors of places in Greater London
Members of Woolwich Metropolitan Borough Council